Aleksandr Sergeyevich Pantsyrev (born 8 December 1993) is a Russian football player.

Club career
He made his professional debut in the Russian Professional Football League for FC Oktan Perm on 18 April 2014 in a game against FC Chelyabinsk.

References

1993 births
Footballers from Kazan
Living people
Russian footballers
Russia under-21 international footballers
Association football midfielders
FC Amkar Perm players
Russian Premier League players
FC KAMAZ Naberezhnye Chelny players
FC Nizhny Novgorod (2015) players
FC Neftekhimik Nizhnekamsk players
FC Chayka Peschanokopskoye players